General elections were held in Bangladesh on 30 December 2018 to elect 300 directly-elected members of the Jatiya Sangsad. The result was another landslide victory for the Awami League-led Grand Alliance led by Sheikh Hasina. 

According to political scientist Ali Riaz, the elections were not free and fair. BBC News, among others, observed some apparent vote rigging by the Awami League. Opposition leader Kamal Hossain rejected the results, calling it "farcical" and demanding fresh elections to be held under a neutral government. The Bangladesh Election Commission said it would investigate reported vote-rigging allegations from "across the country." The election saw the use of electronic voting machines for the first time.

The elections were marred by violence.

Electoral system
The 350 members of the Jatiya Sangsad consist of 300 directly elected seats using first-past-the-post voting in single-member constituencies, and an additional 50 seats reserved for women. The reserved seats are distributed based on the proportional vote share of the contesting parties, and filled with women elected by the elected members. Each parliament sits for a five-year term.

Approximately 100 million voters were expected to vote from 40,199 polling stations across the country. Electronic voting machines were used in six constituencies.

Background
The previous general elections in January 2014 were boycotted by the main opposition alliance, led by the Bangladesh Nationalist Party (BNP) and three-time former Prime Minister Khaleda Zia. As a result, the Awami League led by Prime Minister Sheikh Hasina won a landslide victory, taking 234 of the 300 seats in an election that saw 153 seats uncontested.

In July 2017, the BNP stated that it was ready to contest the next general elections if parliament was dissolved and the election commission consisted of non-partisan members. On 14 September 2017 the Official Chief Election Commissioner confirmed that the BNP would contest the elections. However, following the conviction of BNP chair Khaleda Zia for corruption, the High Court of Bangladesh ruled that Zia was ineligible to run for office. As such her role is unclear in any potential government which contained the BNP.

Campaign
In August 2017, Jatiya Party (Ershad) chairman and former President Hussain Ershad indicated that he wanted his party to leave the Awami League-led Grand Alliance and join a new alliance with democratic left and Islamic democratic parties. In November 2018 the party announced that it would join the Awami League-led alliance. On 28 December, Ershad announced Jatiya Party candidates contesting from “open seats” would support the ruling Awami League-led grand alliance candidates and extended his support to "my [his] 'sister' Prime Minister Sheikh Hasina". Ershad personally withdrew from contesting the Dhaka-17 seat in favour of the Awami League candidate. Ershad said however that “strong candidates” of his party would stay in the race.

On 13 October 2018, the Jatiya Oikya Front (National Unity Front) was formed, consisting primarily of the Gano Forum, Bangladesh Nationalist Party, Jatiya Samajtantrik Dal (Rab) and Nagorik Oikya, led by former Foreign Minister Kamal Hossain of the Gano Forum. On 18 December the alliance announced a 14-point manifesto, which included a pledge to reduce the power of the office of Prime Minister.

There was controversy in the run up to the elections surrounding the nomination of banned Jamaati candidates under the BNP banner. In 2013, the hard-line, right-wing, Islamist party, Jamaat-e-Islami was banned from registering and therefore contesting in elections by the High Court, citing their charter violates the constitution. Twenty-five Jamaati candidates ran in the election, with twenty-two nominations for BNP and three running as independents. An investigation was launched but on 23 December the Election Commission Secretary Helaluddin Ahmed said they had examined the related law and "there is no scope for rejecting the Jamaat leaders' candidacy at this moment." On 26 December, just days before the election, Jatiya Oikya Front leader Kamal Hossain expressed his regret about Jamaat's involvement in the elections under his alliance, claiming "had I known [that Jamaat leaders will be given BNP tickets] I would not have been part of it." The media however had reported involvement at the end of November.

Khaleda Zia filed nomination papers for the Bogra-6, Bogra-7 and Feni-1 constituencies. All three sets of nomination papers were rejected by the Election Commission as a result of her convictions in two corruption cases. The Constitution states anyone sentenced to more than 2 years imprisonment for a criminal offence must allow 5 years to lapse before being permitted to contest a parliamentary constituency. The Supreme Court upheld an order issued by the High Court to that effect ending any possibility of Zia contesting a constituency. 

In accordance with election commission rules, campaigning was halted at 08:00 AM on the morning of 28 December.

Parties and alliances







Others

Conduct

Violence

Between 9 and 12 December 2018, 47 incidents of violence were reported, in which eight people were killed and 560 were injured.

According to the BNP Office, as of 26 December 2018, at least 12,923 people (mostly BNP, Jatiya Oikya Front and 18 Party Alliance activists) had been injured in 2,833 attacks on opposition candidates. Between 8 November and 25 December, at least 1,574 cases were filed against BNP officials in different districts. During the same period, 15,568 activists were arrested. According to The Daily Star, at least 56 candidates, mostly from the BNP, were attacked, with around 1,190 people injured and over 800 BNP-Jamaat officials arrested between 10 and 28 December.

On 29 December, the day before the elections, the Bangladesh Telecommunication Regulatory Commission suspended 3G and 4G connections across the country until after the elections.

Newspaper Daily Star wrote on 17 December 2018 that in  violence before Bangladesh elections some opposition candidates were attacked, 13 of them were injured and two arrested 

On election day, at least 17 people were killed in clashes between ruling party supporters and the opposition.

Reports say that many supporters of the opposition Parties were arrested just before Bangladesh elections on 30 December 2018. The violence that erupted before the election day left at least 17 people dead.

On 3 January 2019, Human Rights Watch called for an investigation on attack on members of the opposition party on and before Bangladesh elections.

Vote rigging
A BBC correspondent reported seeing a ballot box already full of votes prior to the polling station in Chittagong opening. Allegations of voting irregularities including polling booths inexplicably closing for “lunch breaks”, voters being turned away and ballots being counted unrealistically quickly were widespread. Local media published accounts by correspondents who claimed to have witnessed Awami League members stuffing ballot boxes in the presence of police and election officials. Voters also complained about getting the ruling party's symbol stamped on their ballot papers and being instructed to vote for the ruling party in polling centers. In the presence of the voting officers, some voters had to vote for Awami League candidates and refused to accept, yet their ballots were also dropped into the ballot box. The Bangladesh Election Commission promised to investigate numerous reports of vote rigging.

Suppression of opposition
Opposition candidates had encountered violence, threats and harassment when they attempted to campaign. Dozen of candidates of the main opposition party, the BNP, were arrested on spurious charges. Few electoral agents from the opposition showed up at polling stations. Those who did show up were prevented from entering the stations by supporters of the ruling party, according to Kamal Hossain.

Results

By constituency

Reactions 
  The Fifth King of Bhutan and Prime Minister of Bhutan Lotay Tshering congratulated Hasina and her party in a written message of congratulation.
  Chinese President Xi Jinping and Prime Minister of China Li Keqiang greeted Sheikh Hasina on a landslide victory.
  Prime Minister of India Narendra Modi congratulated Hasina on the landslide victory. 
  Prime Minister of Nepal Khadga Prasad Oli congratulated Hasina on the victory.
  Palestinian President Mahmoud Abbas congratulated Hasina on her party's victory in a telephone call .
  The Emir congratulated Hasina in a written message of congratulation.
  President Vladimir Putin congratulated Hasina in a written message of congratulation.
  The King and Crown prince congratulated Hasina and her party in a written message of congratulation.
  The President and Prime Minister of Sri Lanka greeted Sheikh Hasina on a landslide victory.

See also
List of members of the 11th Jatiya Sangsad

Notes

References

General
Bangladesh
General election
Bangladesh
General elections in Bangladesh
Election and referendum articles with incomplete results